The 2018 Algarve Cup was the 25th edition of the Algarve Cup, an invitational women's football tournament held annually in Portugal. It took place from 28 February to 7 March 2018.

The final was cancelled after torrential rain flooded the pitch: the Netherlands and Sweden were declared joint winners of the Algarve Cup.

Format
The twelve invited teams were split into three groups to play a round-robin tournament.

Points awarded in the group stage followed the standard formula of three points for a win, one point for a draw and zero points for a loss. In the case of two teams being tied on the same number of points in a group, their head-to-head result determine the higher place.

Teams

Venues
 Albufeira Municipal Stadium, Albufeira
 Bela Vista Municipal Stadium, Parchal
 Estádio Algarve
 Lagos Municipal Stadium, Lagos
 VRS António Sports Complex, Vila Real de Santo António

Squads

Group stage
The groups were announced on 6 December 2017, and re-organised on 18 December, due to South Korea being drawn against Australia in the Asian Cup finals the following month.

All times are local (UTC±0).

Tie-breaking criteria
For the group stage of this tournament, where two or more teams in a group tied on an equal number of points, the finishing positions were determined by the following tie-breaking criteria in the following order:
 number of points obtained in the matches among the teams in question
 goal difference in all the group matches
 number of goals scored in all the group matches
 fair-play ranking in all the group matches
 FIFA ranking

Group A

Group B

Group C

Ranking of teams for placement matches
The ranking of the 1st, 2nd, 3rd, and 4th placed teams in each group to determine the placement matches:

1st placed teams

2nd placed teams

3rd placed teams

4th placed teams

Placement matches

Eleventh place game

Ninth place game

Seventh place game

 The match was abandoned at half-time with the score 0–0 due to torrential rain that flooded the pitch: both teams were awarded joint seventh place.

Fifth place game

Third place game

Final

The final was cancelled after torrential rain flooded the pitch: the Netherlands and Sweden were declared joint winners of the Algarve Cup.

Final standings

Awards

Goalscorers
3 goals

 Christine Sinclair
 Lieke Martens
 Fridolina Rolfö

2 goals

 Chloe Logarzo
 Sam Kerr
 Janine Beckie
 Hlín Eiríksdóttir
 Mana Iwabuchi
 Elise Thorsnes
 Lee Min-a
 Stina Blackstenius

1 goal

 Caitlin Cooper
 Larissa Crummer
 Clare Polkinghorne
 Ashley Lawrence
 Jessie Fleming
 Liu Shanshan
 Song Duan
 Xu Yanlu
 Pernille Harder
 Frederikke Thøgersen
 Sanne Troelsgaard Nielsen
 Yui Hasegawa
 Emi Nakajima
 Yuika Sugasawa
 Rumi Utsugi
 Lineth Beerensteyn
 Shanice van de Sanden
 Cheyenne van den Goorbergh
 Stefanie van der Gragt
 Siri Worm
 Ingrid Engen
 Maren Mjelde
 Lisa-Marie Utland
 Carole Costa
 Nádia Gomes
 Vanessa Malho
 Carolina Mendes
 Cláudia Neto
 Diana Silva
 Anna Belomyttseva
 Sofia Shishkina
 Han Chae-rin
 Jung Seol-bin
 Filippa Angeldal
 Mimmi Larsson

Own goal
 Simone Boye Sørensen (playing against the Netherlands)

References

External links
Official website

 
2018
2018 in women's association football
2017–18 in Portuguese football
March 2018 sports events in Portugal
2018 in Portuguese women's sport
February 2018 sports events in Portugal